Ian Alistair Mackenzie  (July 27, 1890 – September 2, 1949) was a Canadian parliamentarian.

Life and career
Born in Assynt, Scotland, Mackenzie entered politics by winning a seat in the Legislative Assembly of British Columbia (BC) in the 1920 BC election. In 1930, he was appointed to Prime Minister William Lyon Mackenzie King's pre-election Cabinet as Minister of Immigration and Colonization and Superintendent of Indian Affairs. While he won his seat in the 1930 federal election the Liberal Party was defeated across the country. Mackenzie entered Parliament as an Opposition Member of Parliament (MP).

When the Liberals returned to power through the 1935 election, Mackenzie returned to Cabinet as Minister of National Defence where he had the responsibility for pre-war rearmament. With the outbreak of World War II in 1939, however, Mackenzie was moved to the position of Minister of Pensions and National Health, in part because of his role in a scandal involving the awarding of a contract to manufacture the Bren Gun. In 1944, he became Minister of Veterans Affairs.

Mackenzie was an able parliamentarian, and when the increasing pressures of war led Prime Minister King to decide to delegate some of his responsibilities in the House of Commons to the new position of Government House Leader, he chose Mackenzie as the first MP to hold that responsibility.

During the war, Mackenzie pandered to anti-Japanese sentiment in British Columbia by declaring to his constituents at his 1944 nomination meeting "Let our slogan be for British Columbia: 'No Japs from the Rockies to the seas.'" As British Columbia's senior cabinet minister Mackenzie had a key role in the government's decision to intern Japanese-Canadians for the duration of the war.

In 1947, Mackenzie was named to the Imperial Privy Council along with several other senior Canadian cabinet ministers, allowing him to use the honorific of "Right Honourable". In 1948, he was appointed to the Senate of Canada. He served only a year and a half until his death in 1949.

Archives 
There is an Ian MacKenzie fonds at Library and Archives Canada.

References

External links
 

1890 births
1949 deaths
British Columbia Liberal Party MLAs
Lawyers in British Columbia
Canadian Presbyterians
Liberal Party of Canada MPs
Liberal Party of Canada senators
Canadian senators from British Columbia
Members of the House of Commons of Canada from British Columbia
Canadian members of the Privy Council of the United Kingdom
Members of the King's Privy Council for Canada
People from Sutherland
Anti-Japanese sentiment
Canadian people of World War II